Dame Denise Mary Holt, DCMG (née Mills; born 1 October 1949, Vienna, Austria) was British Ambassador to Mexico (2002–05) and Spain and Andorra (2007–09). She is currently the Chair of Council at the University of Sussex.

A Non-Executive Director of HSBC Bank plc (2011-) and Chairman of M&S Bank (an HSBC subsidiary), Denise joined the Board of Nuffield Health in 2013 and in 2014 became a NED on the Board of Iberdrola SA, a Spanish energy company, having previously served on the Boards of Scottish Power Renewables and Scottish Power Energy Holdings (both Iberdrola subsidiaries).

Previous roles include  Ofqual (the examinations regulator in England) from 2010-2013 and the NHS Pay Review Body 2010-2014. She was Chair of Trustees of the Anglo-Spanish Society (2010-2013), a member of the Management Council of the Canada Blanch Centre for Contemporary Spanish Studies at LSE, and Chair of the  Institute of Latin American Studies at the University of London. On 20 June 2011, Scottish Power Renewables announced in a press release that they had appointed Holt to their board as a non-executive director.

Holt grew up in Russia, Japan, Lebanon, Netherlands, Iran and Bulgaria. She was educated at New Hall School, Chelmsford, and Bristol University where she studied Spanish, French and Politics. She joined the Foreign and Commonwealth Office in 1970 as research analyst for Spain and Portugal. Overseas postings included Ireland in 1984, where she was First Secretary of the British Embassy in Dublin, followed by a spell as head of the Central American Section at the Foreign and Commonwealth Office (1988–1990).

She served as First Secretary of the British Embassy in Brazil (1991–1993). She was deputy head of Eastern Department, responsible for relations with newly independent countries of Central Asia and the Trans Caucasus. In 1996, she was appointed as deputy director of human resources in the FCO (1999–2001) and later director. Later on in her career she also became director for migration and for the Overseas Territories (2005–07) at the FCO.

Personal life
Denise married David Holt in 1987 while they were both serving in the British Embassy in Ireland; the couple has one child, a son, Patrick Holt.

Honours
From Companion of the Order of St Michael and St George, she was elevated to Dame Commander of that same order (DCMG) in the 2009 Birthday Honours. Holt was awarded an Honorary Doctor of Laws by Bristol University in July 2012.

Affiliations

In 2011 she joined the Board of HSBC Bank plc as a Non-Executive Director. She is a board member of Ofqual (the examinations regulator in England), and Independent Chair of the nominations committee of the Alzheimer's Society. She is also a member of the Council of Bristol University (2014-) and Independent Chair of the nominations committee of the Alzheimer's Society.

Footnotes

1949 births
British women ambassadors
Dames Commander of the Order of St Michael and St George
Living people
Ambassadors of the United Kingdom to Andorra
Ambassadors of the United Kingdom to Spain
Ambassadors of the United Kingdom to Mexico
Ambassadors of the United Kingdom to Ireland
People educated at New Hall School
Alumni of the University of Bristol
Directors of Iberdrola